Intense tropical cyclone is the second-highest classification used within the South-West Indian Ocean to classify tropical cyclones with and are amongst the strongest tropical cyclones that can form on Earth. A total of 101 tropical cyclones have peaked as an intense tropical cyclone while in the South-West Indian Ocean, which is denoted as the part of the Indian Ocean to the south of the equator and to the west of 90°E. The most recent intense tropical cyclone was Cyclone Halima of the 2021–22 season.

Background
The South-West Indian Ocean tropical cyclone basin is located to the south of the Equator between Africa and 90°E. The basin is officially monitored by Météo-France's tropical cyclone centre on the island of Reunion (MFR, RSMC La Réunion). In addition, the Mauritius Meteorological Service and the Madagascan Direction Generale de la Meteorologie are classified as subregional tropical cyclone advisory centres and are responsible for monitoring and naming tropical cyclones in consultation with RSMC La Réunion. Other meteorological services such as the Australian Bureau of Meteorology, Mauritius Meteorological Service as well as the United States Joint Typhoon Warning Center also monitor the basin.

Systems

|-
| Deidre–Delinda ||  ||  ||  || None ||  ||  ||
|-
| Blandine ||  ||  ||  || None ||  ||  ||
|-
| Robyn–Deborah ||  ||  ||  || None ||  ||  ||
|-
| Aurore ||  ||  ||  || No land areas ||  ||  ||
|-
| Celine ||  || ||  || Mauritius, Reunion, Rodrigues ||  ||  ||
|-
| Idylle ||  ||  ||  || Western Australia ||  || Minor ||
|-
| Albine ||  ||  ||  || No land areas ||  ||  ||
|-
| Viola–Claudette ||  ||  ||  || St. Brandon, Mauritius, Réunion || 5 || $175 million ||
|-
| Chris–Damia ||  ||  ||  || Rodrigues, Mauritius || 0 ||  ||
|-
| Karla ||  ||  ||  || No land areas ||  ||  ||
|-
| Andry ||  ||  ||  || Agaléga, Madagascar ||  || Extensive ||
|-
| Bakoly ||  ||  ||  || Mauritius, Réunion ||   ||$21 million||
|-
| Jaminy || ||  ||  || No land areas ||  ||  ||
|-
| Kamisy ||  ||  ||  || Madagascar, Comoros, Mayotte, Seychelles || 69 || $250 million ||
|-
| Erinesta ||  ||  ||  || Tromelin Island, Madagascar, Réunion ||  ||  ||
|-
| Gasitao ||  ||  ||  || No land areas ||  ||  ||
|-
| Walter–Gregoara ||  ||  ||  || No land areas ||  ||  ||
|-
| Harriet–Heather ||  ||  ||  || No land areas ||  ||  ||
|-
| Edwina ||  ||  ||  || Rodrigues, Mauritius, Réunion ||  ||  ||
|-
| Jourdanne ||  ||  ||  || No land areas ||  ||  ||
|-
| Geralda ||  ||  ||  || Madagascar ||  ||  ||
|-
| Litanne ||  ||  ||  || St. Brandon, Madagascar || 0 || None ||
|-
| Nadia ||  ||  ||  || Madagascar, Comoros, Mayotte, Mozambique, Malawi ||  ||  ||
|-
| Odille ||  ||  ||  || St. Brandon, Rodrigues ||   ||  ||
|-
| Albertine ||  ||  ||  || Diego Garcia, Rodrigues ||  ||  ||
|-
| Dorina || ||  ||  || Rodrigues || 0 || None||
|-
| Marlene ||  || ||  || No land areas ||  ||  ||
|-
| Daryl–Agnielle || ||  ||  || No land areas ||  ||  ||
|-
| Bonita ||  || ||  || Madagascar, MozambiqueZimbabwe, Zambia, Angola ||  ||  ||
|-
| Itelle ||  ||  ||  || No land areas ||  ||  ||
|-
| Melanie–Bellamine || ||  ||  || No land areas ||  ||  ||
|-
| Daniella ||  || ||  || Mauritius, Réunion ||  ||  ||
|-
| Davina ||  ||  ||  || Rodrigues, Mauritius, Réunion || 2 || Minor ||
|-
| Frederic–Evrina ||  ||  ||  || No land areas ||  ||  ||
|-
| Connie ||  || ||  || Mauritius, Réunion, Mozambique || 3 || None ||
|-
| Leon–Eline ||  || ||  || Madagascar, Mozambique || 114-722 || $309 million ||
|-
| Ando ||  ||  ||  || Seychelles, Mauritius, Réunion || 2 || None ||
|-
| Charly ||  || ||  || Rodrigues, Mauritius, Réunion || 0 || None ||
|-
| Dina ||  ||  ||  || Mauritius, Réunion ||  ||  ||
|-
| Francesca ||  || ||  || No land areas ||  ||  ||
|-
| Guillaume ||  ||  ||  ||Madagascar, ComorosMauritius, Réunion || 0||  ||
|-
| Ikala ||  ||  ||  || No land areas ||  ||  ||
|-
| Gerry ||  ||  ||  || Mauritius, Réunion || 1||  ||
|-
| Japhet ||  ||  ||  || Mozambique, Zambia, Zimbabwe || 25 ||  ||
|-
| Kalunde ||  ||  ||  || Rodrigues ||  ||  ||
|-
| Beni ||  ||   ||  || Mascarene Islands || 0 || None ||
|-
| Frank ||  || ||  || No land areas ||  ||  ||
|-
| Bento ||  ||  ||  || No land areas ||  ||  ||
|-
| Ernest ||  ||  ||  || Mayotte, Madagascar || 78 ||  ||
|-
| Bertie–Alvin ||  ||  ||  || No land areas ||  ||  ||
|-
| Carina ||  ||  ||  || No land areas ||  ||  ||
|-
| Bondo ||  ||   ||  || Madagascar, Mozambique || 11 ||  ||
|-
| Dora ||  ||  ||  || Rodrigues || 0 || None ||
|-
| Favio ||  ||  ||  ||Mozambique, Madagascar ||  ||  ||
|-
| Gamede ||  ||  ||  || Mascarene Islands || 4 ||  ||
|-
| Indlala ||  ||  ||  || Madagascar ||  ||  ||
|-
| Jaya ||  || ||  || Madagascar || 1 || None ||
|-
| Hondo ||  ||  ||  || Mauritius, Réunion || 0 || Minimal ||
|-
| Ivan ||  || ||  || Madagascar ||  ||  ||
|-
| Jokwe ||  ||  ||  || Madagascar, Mozambique ||  ||  ||
|-
| Kamba ||  || ||  || No land areas ||  ||  ||
|-
| Fanele ||  || ||  || Madagascar ||  ||  ||
|-
| Gael ||  || ||  || Madagascar || 2 || None ||
|-
| Anja ||  ||  ||  || No land areas ||  ||  ||
|-
| Cleo ||  ||  ||  || No land areas ||  ||  ||
|-
| Gelane ||  ||  ||  || Réunion, Mauritius, Rodrigues, Madagascar ||  ||  ||
|-
| Funso ||  ||  ||  || Mozambique, Malawi || 40 ||  ||
|-
| Giovanna ||  ||  ||  || Mauritius, Réunion, Madagascar || 35 ||  ||
|-
| Anais ||  || ||  || Madagascar ||  ||  ||
|-
| Claudia ||  ||  ||  || No land areas ||  ||  ||
|-
| Felleng ||  ||  ||  || Seychelles, Madagascar, Mauritius, Réunion || 9 ||  ||
|-
| Amara ||  ||  ||  || Rodrigues ||  ||  ||
|-
| Bejisa ||  ||  ||  || Seychelles, Réunion, Mauritius || 1 ||  ||
|-
| Colin ||  ||  ||  || No land areas ||  ||  ||
|-
| Kate ||  ||  ||  || No land areas ||  ||  ||
|-
| Uriah ||  ||  ||  || No land areas ||  ||  ||
|-
| Emeraude ||  ||  ||  || No land areas ||  ||  ||
|-
| Enawo ||  ||  ||  || Madagascar, Réunion || 96 || $50 million ||
|-
| Berguitta ||  ||  ||  || Mauritius, Réunion || 1 || $26.5 million||
|-
| Cebile ||  || ||  || No land areas ||  ||  ||
|-
| Dumazile ||  ||  ||  || Madagascar, Réunion || 0 || Unknown ||
|-
| Alcide ||  ||  ||  || Madagascar || 0 || None ||
|-
| Kenanga ||  || ||  || No land areas ||  ||  ||
|-
| Cilida ||  ||  ||  || Mauritius || 0 || Minimal ||
|-
| Funani ||  ||  ||  || Rodrigues || 0 || Minimal ||
|-
| Gelena ||  ||  ||  || Madagascar, Mauritius, Rodrigues || 0 || $1 million ||
|-
| Haleh ||  ||  ||  || No land areas ||  ||  ||
|-
| Idai ||  ||  ||  || Mozambique, MalawiMadagascar, Zimbabwe || 1303 || $2.2 billion ||
|-
| Joaninha ||  || ||  || Rodrigues || 0 || $10.5 million ||
|-
| Kenneth ||  ||  ||  || Seychelles, Madagascar, Comoros, Mozambique, Tanzania, Malawi || 52 || $100 million ||
|-
| Herold ||  ||  ||  || Madagascar, Mascarene Islands ||  ||  ||
|-
| Irondro ||  ||   ||  || No land areas ||  ||  ||
|-
| Batsirai ||  ||  || || Mauritius, Réunion, Madagascar || ||  || 
|-
| Emnati ||  ||  || || Mauritius, Réunion, Madagascar || ||  ||
|-
| Vernon ||  ||  ||  || None || None || None ||
|-
| Gombe ||  ||  ||  || Madagascar, Mozambique ||  ||  ||
|-
| Halima ||  ||  ||  || None || None || None ||
|}

Other systems
In addition to the systems listed above the Mauritius Meteorological Service classifies tropical cyclones in March 1931, January 1945, February 1945, January and February 1946, April 1958 as intense tropical cyclones. It also classifies Alix of 1960, Carol of 1960, Beryl of 1961, Jenny of 1962, Danielle of 1964, Louise of 1970, Gervaise of 1975, Fleur of 1978, Hyacinthe of 1980, Jacinthe of 1980, Laure of 1980, Florine of 1981, and Hollanda of 1994 as intense tropical cyclones.

Systems classified as an ITC per the BOM
Cyclone Kirsty 1985 - 110 kts.
Cyclone Jane–Irna 1992 - 110 kts.

Savannah 2019 weakened into a tropical cyclone as it moved into the basin from the Australian region.

Climatology

See also
South-West Indian Ocean tropical cyclone

References

Intense Tropical Cyclones